Dharyala Jalap is a village and union council, near the Jhelum River, of Jhelum District in the Punjab Province of Pakistan. It is part of Pind Dadan Khan Tehsil. The village gets its name from the Jalap tribe, who make up the bulk of the population.

References

Populated places in Tehsil Pind Dadan Khan
Union councils of Pind Dadan Khan Tehsil